The 1928 Penn Quakers football team was an American football team that represented the University of Pennsylvania as an independent during the 1928 college football season. In their sixth season under head coach Lou Young, the Quakers compiled an 8–1 record, shut out six of nine opponents, and outscored all opponents by a total of 271 to 26. The team was ranked No. 11 in the nation in the Dickinson System ratings released in December 1928. The team played its home games at Franklin Field in Philadelphia.

Schedule

References

Penn
Penn Quakers football seasons
Penn Quakers football